Cabinet of Carlos Andrés Pérez may refer to:
 First presidency of Carlos Andrés Pérez
 Second presidency of Carlos Andrés Pérez